Colonel Hanson Chambers Taylor Jarrett VC (22 March 1839 – 11 April 1891) was a recipient of the Victoria Cross, the highest and most prestigious award for gallantry in the face of the enemy that can be awarded to British and Commonwealth forces.

Details
He was 21 years old, and a lieutenant in the 26th Bengal Native Infantry, Bengal Army during the Indian Mutiny when the following deed took place on 14 October 1858 at Baroun, India for which he was awarded the VC.

References

 Burial Details
 

British East India Company Army officers
1839 births
1891 deaths
Indian Rebellion of 1857 recipients of the Victoria Cross
Military personnel from Chennai
British Indian Army officers